A Dark Lord is a powerful, villainous stock character that appears in the fantasy genre.

Dark Lord may also refer to:

Fictional characters
 Dark Lord of the Sith, a title held by the main antagonists in the fictional Star Wars universe
 Ming the Merciless, a comic book character and archenemy of Flash Gordon
 Morgoth, the main antagonist of J. R. R. Tolkien's Middle-earth works
 Sauron, the main antagonist of The Lord of the Rings by J.R.R. Tolkien
 Lord Voldemort, the main antagonist in the Harry Potter novel series by J.K. Rowling
 Dark Lord Chuckles the Silly Piggy, a character from Dave the Barbarian
 Ganon or Dark Lord Ganondorf, the main antagonist of The Legend of Zelda series
 Mordru or The Dark Lord, a supervillain in DC Comics
 Dark Lord, a villain from Flint the Time Detective
 Darklords of Helgedad, antagonists in the Lone Wolf gamebooks
 Dark Lord, the antagonist in the Doom and its sequel Doom Eternal
 Dracula (Castlevania), known as the Dark Lord in the Castlevania series
 Diablo, the titular main antagonist of the Diablo series
 Darkseid, an alien despot from DC Comics
 Darklord (Ravenloft), a ruler of a domain of the fictional Ravenloft campaign setting for Dungeons & Dragons
 The Darkling Lords, antagonists from Visionaries: Knights of the Magical Light
 The Dark Overlords of the Universe, characters from Howard the Duck
 Dark Lord, the main antagonist in the game Miitopia

Other
 Dark Lord, a famous Russian Imperial Stout beer from Three Floyds Brewing.
 Dark Lord, a nickname for former British cabinet minister Peter Mandelson, Lord Mandelson
 Devil or Satan, the personification of evil in certain religions (see also Prince of Darkness)

See also
 Dark Lady (disambiguation)
 Dark Lord of Derkholm, a novel by Diana Wynne Jones
 Darklords, a Dungeons & Dragons accessory
 Demon Lord (disambiguation)
 Evil Emperor (disambiguation)
 Evil Overlord List
 Good Lord (disambiguation)
 Prince of Darkness (disambiguation)